Racheal Kundananji (born 3 June 2000) is a Zambian professional footballer who plays as a forward for Spanish Liga F club Madrid CFF and the Zambia women's national team.

International career
Kundananji represented Zambia at the 2018 Africa Women Cup of Nations.

International goals
Scores and results list Zambia's goal tally first

References

External links
Racheal Kundananji at BDFútbol
 

2000 births
Living people
Zambian women's footballers
Women's association football forwards
BIIK Kazygurt players
SD Eibar Femenino players
Primera División (women) players
Zambia women's international footballers
Olympic footballers of Zambia
Footballers at the 2020 Summer Olympics
Zambian expatriate women's footballers
Zambian expatriate sportspeople in Kazakhstan
Expatriate women's footballers in Kazakhstan
Zambian expatriates in Spain
Expatriate women's footballers in Spain